Below are select minor league players of the San Diego Padres organization and the rosters of their minor league affiliates:

Players

Lake Bachar

Lake David Bachar (born June 3, 1995) is an American professional baseball pitcher in the San Diego Padres organization.

Bachar attended Wheaton North High School in Wheaton, Illinois, where he played baseball and football. After graduating high school in 2013, he enrolled at the University of Wisconsin-Whitewater on a football scholarship.

After his freshman year at UW-Whitewater, Bachar joined the baseball team in addition to still playing football. In 2015, his sophomore year and first as a member on the baseball team, he appeared in ten games (making seven starts) in which he went 7–1 with a 2.24 ERA and 46 strikeouts. That summer, he played in the Northwoods League for the Lakeshore Chinooks. As a junior in 2016, he went 8–6 with a 2.53 ERA over  innings. Following the season, he was selected by the San Diego Padres in the fifth round of the 2016 Major League Baseball draft. He signed for $350,000.

After signing, Bachar made his professional debut with the Rookie-level Arizona League Padres before earning promotions to the Fort Wayne TinCaps of the Class A Midwest League and the Lake Elsinore Storm of the Class A-Advanced California League. Over 15 games between the three clubs, he went 2–2 with a 3.19 ERA. In 2017, he began the year back in the Arizona League before being promoted back to Fort Wayne. Over 13 games (seven starts), he pitched to a 5–1 record, a 3.38 ERA, and 47 strikeouts over  innings. Bachar began the 2018 season with Lake Elsinore and was promoted to the San Antonio Missions of the Class AA Texas League in May. He went 5–9 with a 4.68 ERA over 27 games (18 starts), pitching a total of  innings between the two teams. In 2019, he appeared in 24 games (19 starts) for the Amarillo Sod Poodles of the Class AA Texas League, going 8–4 with a 3.98 ERA and 126 strikeouts over  innings. Bachar did not play a minor league game in 2020 due to the cancellation of the season, and he missed the whole 2021 season after undergoing Tommy John surgery. He played the 2022 season with San Antonio. Over 27 games (seven starts), he went 5-3 with a 6.15 ERA, 44 strikeouts, and 18 walks over  innings.

Tom Cosgrove

Thomas Cosgrove (born June 14, 1996) is an American professional baseball pitcher in the San Diego Padres organization.

Cosgrove played college baseball at Manhattan College. He was drafted by the San Diego Padres in the 12th round of the 2017 Major League Baseball draft.

The Padres added Cosgrove to their 40-man roster after the 2022 season. Cosgrove was optioned to the Triple-A El Paso Chihuahuas to begin the 2023 season.

Ángel Felipe

Ángel Alberto Felipe (born August 30, 1997) is a Dominican professional baseball pitcher in the San Diego Padres organization.

Felipe signed with the Tampa Bay Rays as an international free agent in June 2015. He played in the Rays organization until 2021. 

On January 4, 2022, Felipe signed a minor league contract with the San Diego Padres organization. The Padres added him to their 40-man roster on August 30, 2022.

Felipe was optioned to the Triple-A El Paso Chihuahuas to begin the 2023 season.

Mason Fox

Mason T. Fox (born January 7, 1997) is an American professional baseball pitcher in the San Diego Padres organization.

Fox attended Pisgah High School in Canton, North Carolina and played college baseball at Gardner-Webb University. He was drafted by the San Diego Padres in the 21st round of the 2018 Major League Baseball draft.

Fox made his professional debut in 2018 with the Arizona League Padres, going 1–1 with a 3.80 ERA over  innings. In 2019, he pitched for the Tri-City Dust Devils, Fort Wayne TinCaps and Lake Elsinore Storm, pitching to a combined 3–0 record, 0.55 ERA, and 56 strikeouts over  innings pitched in relief. Due to the cancellation of the 2020 Minor League Baseball season due to COVID-19, he did not pitch for a team. He spent the 2021 season in the Arizona League along with the San Antonio Missions and El Paso Chihuahuas. Over  innings pitched between the three teams, Fox went 3–3 with a 10.53 ERA, 25 walks, and 48 strikeouts.

Korry Howell

Korry Howell (born September 1, 1998) is an American professional baseball outfielder in the San Diego Padres organization.

Howell attended Homewood-Flossmoor High School in Flossmoor, Illinois, and Kirkwood Community College in Cedar Rapids, Iowa. Following his freshman year at Kirkwood, he was selected by the Kansas City Royals in the 19th round of the 2017 Major League Baseball draft, but did not sign. As a sophomore at Kirkwood, he hit .401 with forty stolen bases over sixty games. He was selected by the Milwaukee Brewers in the 12th round of the 2018 Major League Baseball draft, and signed for $210,000.

Howell made his professional debut with the Rookie-level Arizona League Brewers, batting .311/.398/.350 over 28 games. In 2019, he played with the Wisconsin Timber Rattlers of the Class A Midwest League with whom he hit .235 with two home runs, 22 RBIs, 12 doubles, and 19 stolen bases over 91 games. He did not play a minor league game in 2020 after the cancellation of the season due to the COVID-19 pandemic, and spent the summer playing with the Joliet Slammers of the independent Frontier League. To begin the 2021 season, he was assigned back to the Timber Rattlers, now members of the High-A Central. He was promoted to the Biloxi Shuckers of the Double-A South in early August. Over 107 games between the two clubs, he slashed .244/.349/.455 with 16 home runs, 51 RBIs, and 24 stolen bases.

On April 6, 2022, Howell was traded to the San Diego Padres along with Brett Sullivan in exchange for Victor Caratini. He was assigned to the San Antonio Missions of the Double-A Texas League to open the season. He batted .248 with six home runs, twenty RBIs, and 12 stolen bases over 48 games before suffering a season-ending injury.

Alek Jacob

Alek Scott Jacob (born June 16, 1998) is an American professional baseball pitcher in the San Diego Padres organization.

Jacob grew up in Spokane, Washington and attended North Central High School.

Jacob played college baseball career at Gonzaga. He was named to the West Coast Conference All-Freshman team. As a senior, Jacob was named the West Coast Conference Pitcher of the Year after going 8-1 with three saves, a 2.52 ERA, and 112 strikeouts in  innings pitched over 17 appearances with 11 starts.

Jacob was selected in the 16th round by the San Diego Padres in the 2021 Major League Baseball draft. He was assigned to the Rookie-level Arizona Complex League Padres to start his professional career before being promoted to the Lake Elsinore Storm of Low-A West. Jacob began the 2022 season with the Fort Wayne TinCaps of the High-A Midwest League, where he won three games and surrendered no earned runs in four appearances before being promoted to the Double-A San Antonio Missions.

Gonzaga Bulldogs bio

Taylor Kohlwey

Taylor Kohlwey (born July 20, 1994) is an American professional baseball outfielder in the San Diego Padres organization.

Kohlwey attended Holmen High School in Holmen, Wisconsin, and played college baseball at the University of Wisconsin–La Crosse. As a senior at UW-La Crosse in 2016, he batted .485 with nine home runs, 57 RBIs, 22 doubles, and 76 runs scored over 49 starts. Following his senior season, he was selected by the San Diego Padres in the 21st round of the 2016 Major League Baseball draft.

Kohlwey split his first professional season between the Tri-City Dust Devils, Fort Wayne TinCaps, and Lake Elsinore Storm, and returned to Lake Elsinore for the 2017 season. He played the 2018 season with Lake Elsinore and the San Antonio Missions, and split the 2019 season between Lake Elsinore, the Amarillo Sod Poodles, and the El Paso Chihuahuas. He played the 2021 season with both San Antonio and El Paso. He returned to El Paso for the 2022 season. Over 128 games, he compiled a .297/.389/.443 slash line with 11 home runs, 82 RBIs, and 32 doubles.

Wisconsin-La Crosse Eagles bio

José López

José Alexander López (born February 15, 1999) is an Dominican professional baseball pitcher for the San Diego Padres of Major League Baseball.

The Padres selected José López from the Tampa Bay Rays in the Rule 5 draft after the 2022 season.

Joshua Mears

Joshua Livingstone Mears (born February 21, 2001) is an American professional baseball outfielder in the San Diego Padres organization.

Mears was born in Kirkland, Washington and attended Federal Way High School. He batted .509 with ten home runs as a senior. Mears had committed to play college baseball at Purdue University prior to being drafted.

Mears was selected in the second round of the 2019 Major League Baseball draft by the San Diego Padres and received a $1 million signing bonus. After signing with the team, he was assigned to the Arizona League Padres and batted .253 with seven home runs, 24 RBIs, and thirty runs scored in 166 at-bats. Mears was named to the Padres' 2021 Spring Training roster as a non-roster invitee and entered the season as the organization's 10th-ranked prospect by MLB.com. He was assigned to the Low-A Lake Elsinore Storm for the 2021 season. Over 71 games, he slashed .244/.368/.529 with 17 home runs, 48 RBIs, and ten stolen bases. He missed time during the season due to injury.

Ethan Salas

Ethan Gabriel Salas (born June 1, 2006) is an American-born Venezuelan professional baseball catcher in the San Diego Padres organization.

Salas played for the Águilas del Zulia of the Venezuelan Winter League in 2022/2023.

Considered the top international free agent in the 2023 class, Salas signed with the San Diego Padres in January for a record $5.6 million bonus.

His brother, José Salas, plays in the Minnesota Twins organization.

Brett Sullivan

Brett Charles Sullivan (born February 22, 1994) is an American professional baseball catcher in the San Diego Padres organization.

Sullivan played college baseball at the University of the Pacific. He was drafted by the Tampa Bay Rays in the 17th round of the 2015 Major League Baseball Draft. He played in the Rays organization until 2021.

Sullivan signed a major league deal with the Milwaukee Brewers on December 1, 2021.

On April 6, 2022, Sullivan was traded to the San Diego Padres along with Korry Howell in exchange for Víctor Caratini.

Matt Waldron

Matthew Lawrence Waldron (born September 26, 1996) is an American professional baseball pitcher in the San Diego Padres organization.

Waldron attended Westside High School in Omaha, Nebraska, where he played on their baseball team and went 9-0 with a 1.29 ERA, 82 strikeouts, and seven walks over 65 innings as a senior in 2015. He threw a no-hitter in the Class A Baseball State Championship, helping lead Westside to their third straight title. He went unselected in the 2015 Major League Baseball draft, and enrolled at the University of Nebraska where he played four years of college baseball. As a senior in 2019, he made 14 starts and went 6-4 with a 3.05 ERA and 93 strikeouts over  innings. Following the season's end, he was selected by the Cleveland Indians in the 18th round of the 2019 Major League Baseball draft.

Waldron signed with the Indians and made his professional debut with the Arizona League Indians before he was promoted to the Mahoning Valley Scrappers. Over  innings between the two teams, he went 4-0 with a 2.96 ERA. He did not play a minor league game in 2020 due to the cancellation of the minor league season.

On August 31, 2020, the Indians trade Waldron, Mike Clevinger, and Greg Allen to the San Diego Padres in exchange for Austin Hedges, Josh Naylor, Cal Quantrill, Gabriel Arias, Owen Miller, and Joey Cantillo. He opened the 2021 season with the Fort Wayne TinCaps and was promoted to the San Antonio Missions in July. He finished the season starting twenty games going 3-8 with a 4.25 ERA and 103 strikeouts over  innings. Waldron returned to San Antonio to begin 2022 and was promoted to the El Paso Chihuahuas in late June. Over 25 starts between the two teams, he went 5-10 with a 6.26 ERA and 96 strikeouts over  innings.

Waldron's twin brother, Mike, also played on the Nebraska baseball team.

Nebraska Cornhuskers bio

Jackson Wolf

Jackson David Wolf (born April 22, 1999) is an American professional baseball pitcher in the San Diego Padres organization.

Wolf attended Lincoln High School in Gahanna, Ohio, where he played baseball. He went unselected in the 2017 Major League Baseball draft and enrolled at West Virginia University where he played college baseball.

During the summer of 2019, Wolf played in the Cape Cod Baseball League with the Cotuit Kettleers. As a senior at West Virginia in 2021, he started 14 games and went 6-5 with a 3.03 ERA and 104 strikeouts over 89 innings. Following the end of the season, he was selected by the San Diego Padres in the fourth round with the 129th overall selection of the 2021 Major League Baseball draft. He signed with the team for $300,000.

Wolf split his first professional season in 2021 between the Arizona Complex League Padres and the Lake Elsinore Storm, posting a 3.00 ERA and 24 strikeouts over 15 innings. He opened the 2022 season with the Fort Wayne TinCaps, starting 22 games and going 7-8 with a 4.01 ERA and 134 strikeouts over 119 innings. He was later promoted to the San Antonio Missions near the season's end with whom he made two starts.

West Virginia Mountaineers bio

Full Triple-A to Rookie League rosters

Triple-A

Double-A

High-A

Single-A

Rookie

Rookie

References

San Diego Padres players
Lists of minor league baseball players
Minor league players